Doulougou is a department or commune of Bazèga Province in central Burkina Faso. Its capital lies at the town of Doulougou. According to the 1996 census the department has a total population of 25,935.

Towns and villages
Doulougou (capital) BangléongoBélégréBinglaBorogoDabogtingaDouréGanaGodinGuidgrétingaGuidissiKagamzincéKombous-YoungoLamzoudoNabdogoNabinskiemaPibséPoédogoRakaye MossiRakaye YarcéSampogrétingaSamsaongoSaranaSeloghinSilembaSincénéSoulliTampouriToébanégaToghinWanféréWattinomaWidiYangaYougritenga

References

Departments of Burkina Faso
Bazèga Province